Uilliam Ó Dubhda was Bishop of Killala from 1346 to 1350.

References

1350 deaths
14th-century Roman Catholic bishops in Ireland
Bishops of Killala
Religious leaders from County Mayo
Year of birth unknown